Raymond Kristoffer Gutierrez (born January 21, 1984), known professionally as Raymond Gutierrez, is a Filipino-American TV host, editor, columnist, endorser, entrepreneur and occasional actor in the Philippines. He is best known for hosting Pinoy Idol in 2008. He was also one of the hosts of Showbiz Police.

Early life
Raymond Gutierrez was born in Los Angeles, California to matinee idol Eddie Gutierrez and talent manager Annabelle Rosales Rama-Gutierrez. He is the 5th of six siblings. He has an older sister Ruffa Gutierrez, a twin brother Richard Gutierrez, two older brothers, Rocky Gutierrez and Elvis Gutierrez, and a younger brother Ritchie Paul Gutierrez. He also has two older half-brothers Tonton Gutierrez and Ramon Christopher Gutierrez.

After living for a few years in the Philippines, his family moved to Beverly Hills, California. He attended Beverly Hills High School in Beverly Hills, California.

Personal life
He began acting as a child with his twin Richard. He has also worked with his father and his other siblings in some Filipino movies.

According to his parents, Eddie and Annabelle Gutierrez, Raymond is the funniest among the Gutierrez children. They said that Raymond is the one who makes them laugh the most. His mother added that among her 6 children, Raymond is the most diligent and that he was the only one who did not need a tutor while growing up.

In September 2012, his mother filed her Certificate of Candidacy as a congresswoman in Cebu but lost during the 2013 elections.

Gutierrez identifies himself as a "Nightlife Connoisseur" in their reality TV series It Takes Gutz to be a Gutierrez.

Sexuality
On August 1, 2021, Gutierrez came out as gay in an interview with MEGA Entertainment magazine.

Career

Gutierrez has been offered to act in movies and on TV shows but has declined to do so. He says he will just leave it to twin brother Richard, and that he wants to focus on his hosting.

His hosting skills has been praised and awarded many times. He has also impressed some famous personalities who already made their names in the business, like Ryan Seacrest who praised his way of opening his then show, Pinoy Idol.

In October 2011, he became the style director for Esquire Magazine Philippines.

Gutierrez is an endorser of Sexy Solution by Belo. He is also the launch creative consultant and one of the brand ambassadors of Magnum ice cream in the Philippines.

On January 25, 2012, Gutierrez signed a 3-year contract with Viva Entertainment along with his siblings, Richard and Ruffa.

In 2012, Gutierrez became active in hosting live, non-televised events for launching different products in the Philippines. In May 2012, he hosted press events for Bench to launch endorsers such as Joe Jonas of Jonas Brothers, and Allison Harvard and Dominique Reighard of America's Next Top Model.

In June 2012, Gutierrez attended the Men's Fashion Week in London to represent Esquire Philippines.

In July 2012, he became an endorser for Bench/Fix Salon, which is part of the Bench clothing brand.

In August 2012, Showbiz Central, which he co-hosted for 5 years, was replaced with H.O.T. TV, which he still co-hosts. He was also launched as one of the endorsers of TRESemmé in the Philippines.

On September 6, 2012, he hosted the launch of the first Philippine branch of Cotton On in SM Mall Of Asia. On September 22, he hosted the launch of the second in SM Megamall.

Gutierrez also took part in Dolphy Alay Tawa: A Musical Tribute to the King of Philippine Comedy. He co-hosted a segment with his sister Ruffa Gutierrez.

Gutierrez co-owns the Gramercy Cafe which opened in February 2014 and is located at the Gramercy Tower in Makati, Philippines.

Filmography

Magazines

 Preview (as Section Editor)
 Esquire Philippines (as Style Editor, 2011–present)

Newspapers
 "The Dialogue" (column) (The Philippine Star, Fridays)

Notes

References

1984 births
Filipino male child actors
American emigrants to the Philippines
VJs (media personalities)
Filipino male television actors
Filipino television talk show hosts
GMA Network personalities
TV5 (Philippine TV network) personalities
Raymond
Living people
Filipino people of Canadian descent
Filipino people of Spanish descent
Beverly Hills High School alumni
The Philippine Star people
Filipino twins
Filipino male film actors
Filipino LGBT broadcasters
Filipino gay actors